Piotr Ćwielong (born 23 April 1986) is a Polish professional footballer who most recently played as a forward or winger for III liga club LKS Goczałkowice-Zdrój.

Career
Ćwielong was born in Chorzów. At the age of seven he started playing for Ruch Chorzów. Four years later he moved to Stadion Śląski Chorzów – a club known for developing young players. In 2004, he returned to Ruch Chorzów where he played 132 matches and scored 32 goals. Ćwielong scored his first goal for his new team against Pogoń Szczecin at the age of 18.

Career statistics

References

External links

1986 births
Living people
Sportspeople from Chorzów
Association football midfielders
Association football forwards
Polish footballers
Poland international footballers
Poland youth international footballers
Poland under-21 international footballers
Ruch Chorzów players
Wisła Kraków players
Śląsk Wrocław players
VfL Bochum players
VfL Bochum II players
1. FC Magdeburg players
GKS Tychy players
LKS Goczałkowice-Zdrój players
Ekstraklasa players
I liga players
III liga players
2. Bundesliga players
3. Liga players
Polish expatriate footballers
Expatriate footballers in Germany
Polish expatriate sportspeople in Germany